Piletocera octosemalis is a moth in the family Crambidae. It was described by George Hampson in 1896. It is found in Myanmar.

References

octosemalis
Endemic fauna of Myanmar
Moths of Asia
Moths described in 1896